is a series of Japanese dōjin 2D fighting games, developed by the dōjin circle SUBTLE STYLE for Microsoft Windows and arcades. It takes place in an alternate 21 century in the year 200X - 20XX, where most of its characters wears outfits from World War II era.

Games

Akatsuki

Akatsuki Shisei Ichigō

 is the first installment of the series, which was released in November 2003 for Microsoft Windows. As the game itself has no storyline, it is a prototype version of Akatsuki Blitzkampf, below.

Akatsuki Blitzkampf

 is a full version of Akatsuki Shisei Ichigō, developed by the dōjin circle SUBTLE STYLE for Microsoft Windows and arcades.

Akatsuki Blitzkampf Ausf. Achse

 is a final standalone revision of the first game for arcade and Microsoft Windows. After finding success on the Dōjin soft scene, on September 27, 2007, Monthly Arcadia magazine confirmed that the game would be launched as an arcade title, with the provisional name "Akatsuki Blitzkampf AC", published by SUBTLE STYLE itself. The first location test was held on November 23, 2007, at High Tech Land Sega AViON in Japan. It features improved graphical enhancements and re-introduces a new character known as Perfecti (Kanzensha in Japan), who was originally a mere alternate version/palette swap of Mycale in the original Blitzkampf. The final release of Ausf. Achse was in Japanese arcades on February 20, 2008, for the Sega NAOMI system and published with the help of PIC company. Although Ausf. Achse being announced on March 29, 2019, to have a Microsoft Windows port, under the name , the COVID-19 pandemic cause the release date and development to be delayed.

It is a common misconception that the subtitle is a misspelling of the German phrase "Ausf. Achse," meaning "on tour/on the road/on the move". In fact, the term "Ausf." is short for "Ausführung" and has been very common in historic German military nomenclature, meaning "option model" or "version". Therefore, "Ausf. Achse" literally means "option model with axle(s)" or "moveable/mobile/non-stationary version". "Achse" also translates to "axis", and given the game's militaristic style, a very probable translation is "Akatsuki Flash Fight Axis Edition".

EN-Eins Perfektewelt

 is a sequel to Akatsuki Blitzkampf Ausf. Achse, co-developed between Subtle Style and Rutubo Game Works and released on in arcades. It was released on the System Board Y2 arcade system on June 25, 2010. The game was later ported to the Taito Type X² arcade board and released digitally via NESiCAxLive on February 22, 2012.

It is a common misconception that the subtitle is a misspelling of the German phrase "Perfektewelt," meaning "perfect world", referring to the new titular protagonist EN-Eins, the last surviving clone of his cloning batch who aims to defeat one of Knights Templar’s leaders, such as Valkyria (a boss version of her playable clone, Tempelritter) for the sake of creating a perfect world. It also re-introduces Mycale's replacement and former host, Kati as a playable character, as well introducing Anonym-Guard as a replacement of Anonym Merel Lambuth.

EN-Eins Perfektewelt Anastasis

 is an updated version of the sequel game, developed and published by Subtle Style. It was first released on NESiCAxLive arcade digital for the game's NESiCAxLive port's 10th-anniversary debut and to celebrate NESiCAxLive's 12th anniversary, and will likely be the one to be ported in Microsoft Windows, should Subtle Style announce the latter port sometimes later.

It is a common misconception that the subtitle is a misspelling of the Greek phrase "Anastasis," meaning "rebirth", which also represents Subtle Style's return to game development since the series appeared in certain games crossed over. As the series' creator Subtle confirm that the original release was in fact in the beta stage, this update, being an actual finalized version of the original release, not only adds a complete re-worked artwork, UI, and arcade storyline, it re-introduces Mycale in a body of Anonym Merel Lambuth she stole at the end of the previous game and the playable version of Valkyria, as well as introduces a new character who is a motorcyclist Blitzsoldier known by the name Inazuma. Apart from the new version of Mycale and playable Valkyria, 2 unknown brand new characters (a second new playable character and the true final boss (planned to be initially non-playable) were part of the crowdfunding however, the two latter's inclusions did not meet the funding's stretch goal by the time the funding ends.

The crowdfunding held by Subtle Style and its sponsored arcade center KO-HATSU for the new contents within Anastasis first started on April 26, 2022, until June 5, 2022. Game Center Will opened a tournament charity event of original EN-Eins Perfektewelt on May 29, 2022, to support the crowdfunding before the end of the funding date.

At the same time the official website opened on November 11, 2022, the location test was only for November 25 until 27, 2022 at the arcade centers Ko-Hatsu (Osaka), Game Center Will (Tokyo), Maxim Hero (Hokkaido), and Fantasista (Okayama) prefecture,  before its initial launch. Originally, the game’s initial release was meant to be released at the end of 2022. However, on December 5, 2022, Ko-Hatsu and Subtle Style confirms that release date delays to around 2023, in order to fix various gameplay issues based on the location test’s data. Following its wide arcade release in Late February 2023, a proper full version of the game which includes crowdfunded playable characters and finalized contents is in work, with the release date have yet to be revealed.

Gameplay
The game's playstyle is regarded as relatively "old school" in comparison to many other dōjin fighter releases such as Melty Blood, Eternal Fighter Zero, or Big Bang Beat, as many of the systems and conventions in the game are rather similar to several late 1990s fighting games made by companies such as Capcom. The game is slower-paced and focuses more on careful footwork and space control than the aforementioned games. The extra modes the game provides and the ways in which they are unlocked also resemble console releases of old fighting games, further reinforcing the retro feel. A signature feature of the series is the Reflector, a reversal-parry move that allows players to guard against incoming attacks without taking chip damages or cost guard gauge, and can only counterattack at close range, whether on the ground (both standing or crouching) or in the air.

In EN-Eins, the Reflector button (B+C) can also be done in the D button for beginner-friendly use. When activating a burst-like move known as Perfektewelt via A+B+D, will grant the player increased boosts, such as health regeneration, but no longer be able to use EX or regular Super moves when entering this state. Once the gauge limit of Perfektewelt depletes, players cannot use EX or regular Supers, until the regular gauge return to be usable in the next rounds. While in the Perfektewelt state before reaching the gauge limit, players can press A+B+D again to perform an Instant Kill-like attack while in close proximity, the "Perfekte Finish". EN-Eins also introduces a double jump-like air dashes, auto combos, and dash attacks.

The co-op-based modes does not appear in Akatsuki Blitzkampf Ausf. Achse arcade version and original EN-Eins Perfektewelt, with the former’s said port because of its arcade board game space limits, while the latter was a beta like Akatsuki Shisei Ichigo. While the original Akatsuki Blitzkampf have both 2-on-2-based Team Battle Versus and non-canonical Arcade modes which can be played by 1 - 4 players, the initial release of EN-Eins Perfektewelt Anastasis only have 2-on-1-based Dramatic Battle like in Street Fighter series, but it follows the storyline of the first player who starts playing the game.

Synopsis
Akatsuki EN-Eins is set in an alternate Japanese Imperial year, Koki 266X A.D. (200X AD in a Gregorian year) up to 20XX AD, involving several characters that resemble the Nazis and soldiers of the World War II era and a bit from both Mediterranean and Scandinavian myths, among others. In-game visuals supplement this sort of specific militaristic theme and environment, portrayed by the flat and somewhat cubist character portraits and story sequence images. Blitzkampf (Ausf. Achse) is also a finalized version of its 2003 beta title called Akatsuki Shisei Ichigō, involving many characters of the game.

A submarine suddenly emerged in the Arctic Ocean while transporting a new weapon "Blitz Motor" from Germany to Japan. Former Imperial Army high-class technical engineer Akatsuki, who has survived to the present age by hibernating in the frozen submarine, begins to carry out his final orders received during the war, which were to take the Blitz Motor and destroy it should it fall into enemy hands. On the other hand, due to Akatsuki's re-emergence, various organizations who want his Blitz Motor begin to search for him in order to gain the power of the Blitz Motor for themselves.

EN-Eins storyline took place around ten years after Murakumo's defeat at the hands of Akatsuki in 20XX AD. In the said year, there was a small report of a collapse accident in the undeveloped Tibetan Tsampo Canyon. With Murakumo's fall from leadership, this allows the ancient witch Mycale an opportunity to take over "Gesellschaft" (German for "society") assets. A few months later, the world's chaos started due to the simultaneous global terrorist attack by an organization claiming to be the "New Orders of Knights Templar", the one of secretly leading and revealing themselves as the organization's true leader. Taking on this chaos, a dark fight for the hegemony of the new world begins.

Characters

Introduced in Akatsuki Shisei Ichigō
 
 
 High-class technical officer of the Imperial army and one of the former Gesellschaft members. Believed to have died in the Arctic oceans at a critical time after the war came to an end, during the transportation of a new military unit from an allied country. Fifty years later, he returns alive and unchanged in appearance. Now wielding superhuman abilities powered by the original prototype Blitz Motor, he resumes his mission. He soon learns that his last mission during an imperial day was set up by his superior, Murakumo to have himself supposedly killed, but the plan fails as Akatsuki survives and awakens fifty years later. As Murakumo is the original Akatsuki before him and Akatsuki was the first successful Blitz Motor super-soldier, Akatsuki is referred to by his former superior and the rest Fritz, even Kanae as Experiment 1, with Akatsuki's real name is unknown. After he alongside with Sai, Kanae, Marilyn and Wei supposedly killing Murakumo (only killed his original body, but not his soul), Akatsuki is likely the one who found and rescue a young soldier named EN-Eins before they split to a different path for a similar reason, destruction of Gesellschaft and its originator, Mycale's Knights Templar. Few years later, while being targeted by the Knights Templar, who now has Gesellschaft's remaining assets, Akatsuki set to return to Antarctica, believed to be the main source of Blitz technologies.
 He also appeared in Under Night In-Birth (starting from Exe:Late) and BlazBlue: Cross Tag Battle patch 2.0.
 
 
 A French witch from an ancient time that belongs to a secret religious society called "New Orders of Knights Templar" (originally known as an unnamed "Perfecti Cult"); in 1253, they have been manipulating history from behind the scenes and she was planning to wipe out old humanity since Middle Age until the Holy Club interfered and had her original body was burned alive in public for her villainy. Thankfully, she managed to use black magic to link her soul to her weapon Dainsleif, under its sealed marshal wand appearance, and be able to possess a host's body when one of them touches it. She was part of the Gesellschaft alliance during World War II before her host's body from that time was killed by Adler, sometimes after Akatsuki Zero (now Murakumo) sabotaged Akatsuki's submarine in the 1950s. Upon possessing the young Kati in the present, she manipulates her host's parents and is able to avoid Sai's suspicion, in order to further her plans to recover the missing weapons. However, she has to deal with disposing Murakumo over their leadership on leading Gesellschaft, using anyone else's desires, such as Marilyn's ambitions to overthrow Black Hand's leadership from Yin Hu to quickly succeed her plan and obtaining a Blitz Motor from Akatsuki to become a next leader of the triad, then disposing of them as well. Although Mycale is separated from Kati by a Holy Club member Anonym Merel Lambuth, the nun ends up possessed by the witch's soul when she holds the Dainsleif containing the former's soul. While her first "form" is replaced by her spiritual replacement and former host, Kati in the sequel game, EN-Eins Perfektewelt, her second "form", which possessed Merel's body is playable in the Anastasis update.
 There were multiple choices between wearing her glasses or not while possessing Merel's body based on the crowdfunding supporters' choice via comments on Ko-Hatsu's Ci-En account in the first fifteen days of September 2022 for her "new form"'s inclusion in Anastasis. Despite the final poll result on September 21, 2022 where Mycale A. would fight with her glasses on in the final release, the first day of October 2022 reveals a version without wearing her glasses will be included as well, and one of the two versions will act as alternative EX color row.
 
 
 An information broker for the Xinhua computer company of Hong Kong, who is, in reality, an English secret agent for MI6, working undercover to investigate the company's connection to Gesellschaft. He through clandestine means gathers information throughout the world. Rumors say that behind his sunglasses lurks mystical evil eyes that can kill a man instantly and somehow made Sai younger and immortal for decades. Sai had a rivalry with Murakumo fifty years ago and their connection is related to Sai's evil eye abilities. Sai happens to be associated with the family of Kati, a young girl who was possessed by Mycale and concerned about her safety for her parents' sake. After he along with Akatsuki, Kanae, Marilyn and Wei kills Murakumo's original body, once Kati freed from Mycale's possession by Anonym Merel, Sai secures her safety and conjures a curse on a Morgenstern as he found at Gesellschaft Base before the base was destroyed, then later gave the weapon to her, under specific condition for her own safety.
 
 
 A military surgeon who practiced in the Imperial army and was among those who founded Gesellschaft during the war prior to defection fifty years later. During his time with Gesellschaft, he was involved with artificial being projects such as cloning (namely Elektrosoldat) and supposedly defunct cybernization (Blitztank). Albeit becoming unaccounted for afterward, he sets off on eliminating all those who have appeared concurrently with Akatsuki's revival, then investigates the connection between Gesellschaft and its actual originator, Knights Templar. He uses Mugai ryu swordsmanship and a katana Herschel Kotetsu to fight. He may have a prototype Blitz suit as Akatsuki, but does not have a Blitz Motor in it, as evident why he remains aging.
 Added in version 1.02.
 
 
 An intelligence operative, who utilizes a body armored suit to strengthen her entire body. She started out as a lieutenant for the second office of the Ground Staff Overseeing Department in Akatsuki title. With the news of Akatsuki's revival, she is ordered to recover a secret "Blitz Motor", lost at the end of the war, but was ordered to retreat afterward. Unaware to Kanae, her boss, Major Senke is one of Murakumo's clones and somehow disappeared by the time Kanae was discharged from G.S.O.D and recruited by Cabinet Intelligence and Research Office at the same time as Mycale's Knights Templar has all Gesellschaft's assets and declares war on humanity, causing Kanae to find his current whereabout and who Senke truly is. Thanks to CIRO's intelligence, Kanae is able to discover all official governments which Murakumo and Mycale compromised, then backed by eradication troops to find and eradicate them all.
 Added in version 1.03.

Introduced in Akatsuki Blitzkampf
 
 
 An assassin for the continent's largest international mafia "Black Hand" and a master of assassination techniques using Piguaquan. She was born to a farmer family in a rural village at Hebei, China, but unfortunately she was considered a Heihaizi conceived outside from One-child policy, until an Old Farmer adopts her for 100 yuan, and revealing his past history to her and teach her master arts of Piguaquan. She begins to help his farm work, in order to work out her body, and earns enough money to buy "iron sandbag," filled with iron grains and mung beans to train. Being left orphan after Old Farmer passes away, find jobs in the spring in Shanghai for her survival and likely to find a way to honor her adoptive grandfather's wish, she implies for Mizu shōbai and it's very profitable. But one fateful night, she was being accused for touching customer's money during her job. She nearly killed the customer and hostess, as she was running soaked and wet in the rain to alleyway, one of the members of Black Hand found and captured her, yet immediately welcomed by its leader, Yin Hu for her lethal tactics. She was one of top rank assassins and future candidates for leaders to lead Black Hand along with her fellow member, Wei. She was actually being told by Mycale (during her time possessing Kati's body) to murder her boss, Yin Hu as the first request. By plundering the Blitz Motor from Akatsuki, she aims to rise in influence and power. In reality, she was also told by Mycale (as a messenger) to either defeat or kill Akatsuki then take his Blitz Motor from him to take control of the mafia. Until she learned both Mycale and Gesellschaft deceived her, and Yin Hu was the one of Murakumo's clones. Nevertheless, despite failing to defeat Akatsuki then take his Blitz Motor under Mycale's second request, she along with Sai, Kanae and Wei helps Akatsuki to defeat Murakumo. After that, she use big amounts of money to bribe the mafia's higher-up and succeeds taking over Black Hand. By the time Mycale got the Gesellschaft's assets to her Knights Templar and declares war on humanity a few years later, Marilyn enters the war and aid the allied resistance, just to purposely attempt to become the savior of the world in her conquest.
 
 
 A cold-blooded, yet honorable assassin and master of Xingyi Quan, who rose up to the ranks of Black Hand's leaders. After his patron, Yin Hu was assassinated, Wei searches for the criminal. After finding out that his boss, Yin Hu was one of the clones of Murakumo, he along Sai, Kanae and Marilyn helps Akatsuki to defeat Murakumo. After that, he has the list of the clones that infiltrated the organization and the political world, then fake his death for a time being to train himself at a mountain in preparing to kill all Murakumo clones. By the time the Knights Templar has Gesellschaft's assets and declares war on humanity, Wei completed his training at the same time he suspects Murakumo will be there as well.
 
 
 An Armed Inquisitor of Heresy, within a religious society - The Holy Club. She is sent to destroy the headquarters of an organization charged with the heresy of aiding Gesellschaft, the Templar Knights. Anonym is a master of the Lambuth-style gun technique, a combination of Chinese self-defense and two pairs of pistols, Webley-Fosbery. She is replaced by her superior, Anonym-Guard in the sequel game EN-Eins. It is likely that she is the one who saved Kati from Mycale's possession, but is confirmed to have ended up being the current host of the witch.
 
 
 Private Blitzsoldier army of Gesellschaft, and later Knights Templar, cloned from Ernst von Adler. Although equipped with the same Blitz Motor as Akatsuki, albeit the latest version known as “Blitzkamp Motor”, the connection between them lies shrouded in mystery. However, one soldier begins to oppose Gesellschaft, while at the same time of ended up dying of an unknown disease caused by the side-effect of Blitz Motor. The second clone who defects the Knights Templar befriends another defector, EN-Eins, realizing he might be a cure for the Elektrosoldat cloning batch's short lifespan.
 
 
 While primarily a mad scientist, Adler is also a former officer within the organization "Ahnenerbe", as he did research on German ancestry. He participated in the excavation of Tibet's ancient heritage and founded Gesellschaft together but upon the discovery of the ancient city of Agartha, he uses the science for his own ambitions. He is the originator of the Elektrosoldat clone army. It might be possible that he was involved in helping Murakumo murder Mycale's body prior to her possession of young Kati. At some point, before EN-Eins begin, Adler died and was reincarnated by possessing a powerful and stabled Elektrosoldat's body, proclaiming himself as "Super Adler" and resuming his work with the Knights Templar.
  ( in Japan)
 An electrical tank, powered by a modified Blitz Motor, known as "Perfecti Motor" as its source of power. According to a copy of the document on new engine research labeled "Gesellschaft", a test piece was developed. However, it was revoked along with the plan itself before the full-scale production could take place. In the near climax of Akatsuki storyline, the tanks are revealed to be originally dying soldiers who had been cybernated into living tanks as they are now. Playable Blitztank begins to remember something upon encountering Akatsuki and progressively attempts to rebel against Gesellschaft, while another which used by the Knights Templar for warfare against humanity is mind-controlled by EN-Eins to help him save it.
 It also appeared in BlazBlue: Cross Tag Battle, in which it unusually uses the localized name "Blitztank" even in Japanese. 
  (formerly known as )
 
 The final boss of the first game. At the time of the previous war, he was a military officer stationed in Germany who planned actions for an inspection group on military affairs through leading his Akatsuki unit, being both former superior of Akatsuki and ally of Fritz on the unit he led. In this position, he got in touch with Mycale and her Knights Templar, including Ernst von Adler from Ahnenerbe, and established the Military Technique Research facility, nicknamed "Gesellschaft", then discover Agartha and created Blitz Motor. Towards the end of the war, news from Berlin is interrupted, but the "Gesellschaft" remains active. True by his rank, he was the original Akatsuki before the main protagonist himself, as he was a leader of “Akatsuki” unit. Once an honorable man, the discovery of Blitz Motor and the “Perfecti” magical method turned him into a megalomaniac who will do anything to obtain a godhood, which involves sabotages the government and betraying his own allies behind the scenes for fifty years, such as his failed attempt on sabotaging Akatsuki's submarine, having had Adler killed Mycale's previous host to take over Gesellschaft under his rule, and causes Fritz to defect from the organization. The reason he and Mycale having a recent odd each other because of their different views to become an immortal Perfecti, whereas Murakumo wants to rule humanity under his tyrannical rule, while Mycale wants to destroy the old humanity and replace with new ones. Despite his original body was killed by Akatsuki, Sai, Kanae, Marilyn and Wei, he revealed to have some of his clones to be used as his vessel to keep him alive, namely Senke (his current host, and Kanae's superior), and Yin Hu (Black Hand's late-leader who was killed by Marilyn sent by Mycale). Aside ruling G.S.O.D and Black Hand behind the scene, Xinhua Computers was also his sub-organization he ruled, until is its infiltrated by his old nemesis, Sai. While in Senke's body at the time Mycale has all Gesellschaft's assets back to Knights Templar, and declare a war on humanity, Murakumo remains to manipulate the government systems while trying to get Gesellschaft back. He was also involved in the creation of Inazuma, before the latter escape, but resurfaced sometimes later when the Templar wages war on humanity.

Introduced in Akatsuki Blitzkampf Ausf. Achse
 Perfecti ( in Japan)
 
 While Perfecti is commonly a moniker of those who sought to achieve a perfect immortality, whether through body possession or reincarnations, the playable Perfecti in this series is an ultimate form of the witch Mycale, equipped with a different type of Blitzkamp Motor than Adler and his Elektrosoldat unit. She can transform her Dainsleif from its sealed marshal wand state into a Devil Blade bayonet. She was originally a mere palette swap of Mycale in Akatsuki Blitzkampf prior to being re-introduced in Ausf. Achse update as her own character and the second round's sub-boss of the said update after defeating Mycale.

Introduced in EN-Eins Perfektewelt
 
 
 The sole survivor of Gesellschaft's Energaia cloning batch cloned from an unnamed Neuland God, yet inherit the bloodline of another discovered ancient civilization, Neuland. He is presumably saved by Akatsuki. He received the powers of Energaia due to being used for experiments by the Gesellschaft to achieve godhood and destroy the old humanity. EN-Eins aims to stop the evil military organization to avenge his clone "siblings" and save humanity.
 
 
 The former host of Mycale in Akatsuki-title games after the latter possessed the body of the Holy Church member, Anonym Merel Lambuth. As Kati is now freed from Mycale, she becomes her own as a playable character. Kati was born in Germany and raised in Shanghai, China, where her parents are associated with Sai, her first and only known friend. Unknown to her during her time after being freed from Mycale's possession, it was likely that Anonym Merel saved her life at cost of being possessed by Mycale. Once Kati unexpectedly awaken at Tsampo Valley, Tibet, she found a morningstar wand called "Wand of Evil Eye: Morgenstern", and learns that Sai was the one who gave it to her for her own protection. The morningstar she wields holds a dangerous power that may curse its user with its eye. Thankfully, Kati is taught by Sai to be immune to the staff's curse with both index and pinky fingers holding up. Despite Mycale committing unforgivable crimes (including using Kati's body as her previous host), Kati still views her as a friend, due to being lonely like her.
 
 
 The Anonym Merel's replacement, after her disappearance and being possessed by Mycale. She is an elite palace guard of the Holy Club who begin to search for her and freed her from Mycale's possession.
 
 
 The female clones of Valkyria, who resemble Nazi Valkyries serving as Knights Templar's foot soldiers like Elektrosoldat.
 
 
 A self-proclaimed destroyer of the world. Like Adler, also have let themselves be cloned to mass-produce Tempelritter and Elektrosoldat army. She briefly appeared as part of Perfecti's Reflector moves in Akatsuki-titles, until properly she made her debut in the sequel EN-Eins. In the original version of the second game, she was simply a power-up palette swap final boss version of Tempelritter, such as can use EX/Super gauge moves infinitely, even after “Perfektewelt” state being used and was highly recommended for the players to prepare a Reflector against her. Later being re-introduced as a fully playable balanced character in a tentative update title of the second game, Anastasis, to differentiate herself from her clone's moveset.

Introduced in EN-Eins Perfektewelt Anastasis
 
 
A mysterious unidentified Type-1 Blitzsoldier who rides the weaponized Elektromagnetisch Tracked Vehicle, and is thought to be the robotic counterparts of Akatsuki. He was originally found unused in the original version of EN-Eins as an incomplete character. Based on his designs and move sets, Inazuma is a homage to Kamen Riders. Inazuma's origin begins when Murakumo (now possessing Senke's body after Akatsuki along with Sai, Kanae, Marilyn and Wei killed the previous body) took over the Land Research Institute's development. By the time Inazuma was fully created, Inazuma immediately escapes from Murakumo, off-screen, until he resurface from the shadow few years later where the Knights Templar wages war against humanity.
 2 unnamed characters were originally planned through the crowdfunding stretch goal for their inclusion in this game, with the second fighter originally set to be a non-playable true final boss of the updated game. However, in the end, the crowdfunding did not meet its goals for their inclusions in the updated game, by the time the crowdfunding ends, leaving their fates unknown.

Development
It all started in 1995 at the time when Subtle Style founder, Subtle used to work for a certain video game company helping develop numerous fighting games to personally posting multiple illustrations in the past. Sometimes later on April 1, 2000, Subtle left the company he used to work for, and found Subtle Style as a group of dōjin soft developers and begin developing the first entry of Akatsuki EN-Eins series, Akatsuki and released it under a prototype name Akatsuki Shisei Ichigo in November 2003 for Microsoft Windows. Shisei Ichigo would later receive a finalized version under the title Akatsuki Blitzkampf on April 30, 2007. Following the success of Blitzkampf, Subtle shifted to the Arcade scenario and updated the game into an Arcade-only title, Akatsuki Blitzkampf Ausf. Achse, powered by Sega NAOMI and published by PIC on February 28, 2008.

Subtle later shifted to produce a sequel to Akatsuki Blitzkampf Ausf. Achse known as EN-Eins Perfektewelt, features a new protagonist and both updated and newer gameplay systems. The Initial release was published by Rutubo Games Work exclusively in the Japanese arcade, first on SYSTEM BOARD Y 2 on June 25, 2010, before being released digitally via NESiCAxLive on February 22, 2012. The series was put on hiatus when Subtle becomes a recurring freelance sprite artist for French Bread in the said video game developer's later games, starting from allowing the titular Akatsuki protagonist to guest appear in Under Night In-Birth, before Akatsuki EN-Eins series receives proper full worldwide recognition in its crossover appearance in Arc System Works' BlazBlue: Cross Tag Battle since Arc System Works helped publishing Under Night In-Birth outside Japan.

On March 26, 2019, it was revealed on Subtle Style's blog that Akatsuki Blitzkampf Ausf. Achse will be ported to Microsoft Windows, but got delayed due to the emergence of COVID-19 pandemic, leaving the announcement of the release date is remain unknown. Following the announcement of Akatsuki EN-Eins' Kaiden from Akatsuki Blitzkampf Discord e-mailed Subtle in regard for the possibility of Ausf. Achse being released on Steam, due to the current modern worldwide gaming scenario in the PC community. Ten years after the release of NESICAxLive arcade port, just as the COVID-19 pandemic progressively decrease, EN-Eins Perfektewelt receives true finalized version under the tentative update title EN-Eins Perfektewelt Anastasis. The crowdfunding for the development of Anastasis started on April 26, 2022, until June 5, 2022. Additionally, the crowdfunding is backed by a charity tournament of original EN-Eins Perfektewelt at Gamecenter Will on May 29, 2022. At the end of June 5, 2022, two unknown brand new characters will not be included in EN-Eins Perfektewelt Anastasis, due to their inclusion does not meet the funding's stretch goal by the time the funding ends. On July 18, 2022, Subtle Style and Ko-Hatsu revealed through the latter's Ci-En e-mail account that they chose NESICAxLive as the primary arcade port for EN-Eins Perfektewelt Anastasis in response to the decrease of arcades and the arcade cabinets' manufacturers, would affect the arcade centers and industries' current finances. At the same date, Ko-Hatsu confirms that the current development on July is at 70%, originally planned to be released in December 2022 before the end of the year. However, the release date have been delayed to around 2023, due to last month’s climate, and ongoing COVID-19 pandemic.

Reception
The first game in the series, Akatsuki Shisei Ichigō, received mixed reviews from reviewers, who praised the gameplay and art of the game but criticized the small amount characters (3 characters at launch, 5 after being patched) and various gameplay issues. Its finalized version titled Akatsuki Blitzkampf added new characters, backgrounds, and game modes, as well as added online play and further deepened the combat system. Akatsuki Blitzkampf has a strong community in Japan with tournaments and ranking battles in arcade centers like Ko-Hatsu. Outside of Japan communities have formed on websites such as Shoryuken.com (the official host of the Evolution Championship Series fighting game tournaments in the US).

See also
 List of fighting games
 BlazBlue: Cross Tag Battle
 Under Night In-Birth

References

External links
  
 Official Akatsuki Shisei Ichigō website 
 Official Akatsuki Blitzkampf website 
 Official Ausf. Achse website 
 Official EN-Eins Perfektewelt website 
 Official Anastasis website 

Alternate history video games
Arcade video games
Doujin video games
Japan-exclusive video games
Video games set in the 2000s
Rutubo Games games
Fighting games
2D fighting games
Video games developed in Japan
Video games featuring female protagonists
Video games set in Japan
Video games set in China
Windows games
Arcade games
Multiplayer and single-player video games